Giżyce may refer to the following places:
Giżyce, Greater Poland Voivodeship (west-central Poland)
Giżyce, Lublin Voivodeship (east Poland)
Giżyce, Masovian Voivodeship (east-central Poland)